The 2004 Boise State Broncos football team represented Boise State University in the 2004 NCAA Division I-A football season. Boise State competed as a member of the Western Athletic Conference (WAC), and played their home games at Bronco Stadium in Boise, Idaho. The Broncos were led by fourth-year head coach Dan Hawkins. The Broncos finished the season 11–1 and 8–0 in conference (went undefeated 11–0 in the regular season) to win their third straight WAC title and played in the Liberty Bowl, where they lost to Louisville, 44–40.

Schedule

References

Boise State
Boise State Broncos football seasons
Western Athletic Conference football champion seasons
Boise State Broncos football